Khamis Mcha Khamis (born 1 October 1989) is a Tanzanian footballer from Zanzibar who plays as a midfielder for Azam FC.

International career

International goals for Tanzania
Scores and results list Tanzania's goal tally first, score column indicates score after each Khamis goal.

International goals for Zanzibar
Scores and results list Zanzibar's goal tally first, score column indicates score after each Khamis goal.

See also 
 List of top international men's football goalscorers by country

References

External links
 

1989 births
Living people
Zanzibari footballers
Tanzanian footballers
Tanzania international footballers
Zanzibar international footballers
Association football midfielders
Azam F.C. players